John Kemp Starley (24 December 1855 – 29 October 1901) was an English inventor and industrialist who is widely considered the inventor of the modern bicycle, and also originator of the name Rover.

Early life 
Born on 24 December 1855 Starley lived on Church Hill, Walthamstow, London, England. He was the son of a gardener, John Starley, and Mary Ann (née Cippen). In 1872 he moved to Coventry to work with his uncle James Starley, an inventor. He worked with his uncle and William Hillman for several years building Ariel cycles.

Career 
In 1877, he started a new business Starley & Sutton Co with William Sutton, a local cycling enthusiast. They set about developing bicycles that were safer and easier to use than the prevailing penny farthing or "ordinary" bicycles. They started by manufacturing tricycles, and by 1883 their products were being branded as "Rover".

In 1885, Starley made history when he produced the Rover Safety Bicycle.  The Rover was a rear-wheel-drive, chain-driven cycle with two similar-sized wheels, making it more stable than the previous high wheeler designs. Cycling magazine said the Rover had "set the pattern to the world" and the phrase was used in their advertising for many years.

In 1889, the company became J. K. Starley & Co. Ltd and in the late 1890s, it had become the Rover Cycle Company Ltd.

Death 
Starley died suddenly on 29 October 1901, and was succeeded as managing director of the firm by Harry Smyth. Soon after Starley's death the Rover company began building motorcycles and then cars.

See also
Rover (motorcycles)

References

1854 births
1901 deaths
English inventors
Rover Company
British cycle designers
British motorcycle pioneers
British founders of automobile manufacturers
Sustainable transport pioneers
19th-century British businesspeople